Frédéric Krantz (born 13 September 1978 in Bordeaux) is a French sprinter who specialized in the 200 metres.

At the 1998 European Championships he won a silver medal in 4 x 100 metres relay with teammates Thierry Lubin, Christophe Cheval and Needy Guims. As the European champions Great Britain fielded their own World Cup team, the French relay team was selected to represent Europe at the 1998 IAAF World Cup, finishing sixth while Great Britain won the event.

Krantz later finished fifth in relay at the 2000 Summer Olympics, this time with teammates Cheval, Guims and David Patros. He also competed in the 2004 Olympic relay and reached the 200 m quarterfinals of the 2001 World Championships.

His personal best time was 20.49 seconds, achieved in July 2001 in Saint-Étienne.

References

1978 births
Living people
French male sprinters
Athletes (track and field) at the 2000 Summer Olympics
Athletes (track and field) at the 2004 Summer Olympics
Olympic athletes of France
Sportspeople from Bordeaux
European Athletics Championships medalists
Mediterranean Games silver medalists for France
Mediterranean Games medalists in athletics
Athletes (track and field) at the 2005 Mediterranean Games
20th-century French people
21st-century French people